Björn Auðunsson Blöndal (1 October 1787 – 23 June 1846) was an Icelandic District Commissioner and politician. He was a member of Alþingi from 1845 to 1846.

He took the family name Blöndal during his years of study in Copenhagen.

They were the last people to be executed in Iceland, being beheaded at Þrístapar near Vatnsdalshólar in Húnavatnshreppur on the 12th of January 1830.

In popular culture
Australian author Hannah Kent's novel Burial Rites was based on the story of Agnes and Friðrik and featured Björn as a character.

References

External links
 Biography at Alþingi
 Resting place at Garður.is (in Icelandic), retrieved 22 January 2022
 Þrístapar

1787 births
1846 deaths
Members of the Althing